Denis César Olivera Lima (born 29 July 1999) is a Uruguayan footballer who plays as a midfielder for Peñarol in the Uruguayan Primera División on loan from Danubio.

References

External links

1999 births
Living people
Danubio F.C. players
Peñarol players
Uruguayan Primera División players
Uruguayan footballers
Association football midfielders
People from Minas, Uruguay